Below is a full list of parties participating in 2004 Indian general election, and the full results of the election.

National election result

2004 Indian general election
Election results by party
Results of general elections in India